The Burnie International is a professional tennis tournament played on outdoor hardcourts. It is currently part of the ATP Challenger Tour and the ITF Women's Circuit. It is a $75k level tournament for the Challenger Tour and a $60,000 level tournament for the Women's Circuit, although it was previously a $25k level tournament before it was upgraded in 2014. It was held annually in Burnie between 2003 and 2015, but didn't take place in 2016 due to a need for court upgrades.

Prior to 2016, the event was also known as the McDonald's Burnie International. From 2017 to 2019 it was known as the Caterpillar Burnie International. While the tournament was planned to be hosted in 2021 and 2022, neither event happened due to the COVID-19 pandemic.

Past finals

Men's singles

Men's doubles

Women's singles

Women's doubles

References

External links 
 
 
 ITF search

 
ATP Challenger Tour
ITF Women's World Tennis Tour
Recurring sporting events established in 2003
Hard court tennis tournaments
Tennis tournaments in Australia
Tennis in Tasmania